Yelena Nikolayevna Nikolayeva (born 1 February 1966 in Akshiki, Chuvashia) is a Russian race walker.

Her first international achievement was a fifth place at the 1987 World Championships, something which happened again at the 1991 World Indoor Championships. One year later she won an Olympic silver medal behind Chen Yueling. Success followed over the next years, and in 1996 she became the second and last Olympic champion in the 10 kilometres distance, which was replaced by 20 km. Proving to handle the longer distance as well, she won the title at the 2003 World Championships in Paris.

International competitions

References 

1966 births
Living people
People from Mariinsko-Posadsky District
Sportspeople from Chuvashia
Russian female racewalkers
Soviet female racewalkers
Olympic female racewalkers
Olympic athletes of Russia
Olympic athletes of the Unified Team
Olympic gold medalists for Russia
Olympic silver medalists for the Unified Team
Olympic gold medalists in athletics (track and field)
Olympic silver medalists in athletics (track and field)
Athletes (track and field) at the 1992 Summer Olympics
Athletes (track and field) at the 1996 Summer Olympics
Athletes (track and field) at the 2004 Summer Olympics
Medalists at the 1992 Summer Olympics
Medalists at the 1996 Summer Olympics
Goodwill Games medalists in athletics
Competitors at the 1998 Goodwill Games
Competitors at the 2001 Goodwill Games
World Athletics Championships athletes for Russia
World Athletics Championships medalists
World Athletics Championships winners
World Athletics Indoor Championships winners
World Athletics Race Walking Team Championships winners
European Athletics Championships medalists
CIS Athletics Championships winners
Russian Athletics Championships winners